The Battle of Halai, or the Battle of Halay, which took place in December 1894 was a battle between an Eritrean rebel force under Bahta Hagos and the Italian army. 

In the 1890s, the government of Eritrean began plotting an insurrection in Eritrean to push back against Italian encroachment on their country.

Battle
On 15 December 1894, Bahta Hagos, the "chief of Akkele guzay  province in southern eritrea," launched a rebellion against the Italian authorities. 

On 18 December a force of Italian troops, led by Major Pietro Toselli, discovered that the small Italian fort at Halai (garrisoned by 220 men) was being besieged by roughly 220, of Bahta's, rebels. Toselli attacked with 1,500 men, hitting the surprised rebels in their undefended rear. 

The surprise attack was just at the right time since the rebels had almost taken the fort.

At first, Bahta Hagos tried to negotiate with the Italians, however the negotiations lasted only up to 4:00pm, when another 1,000 Italian reinforcements arrived. Bahta was killed in the ensuing fight and his army quickly fell apart soon after.

Aftermath
In total, eleven Italians were killed and twenty-two were wounded in the action.

References

1894 in Ethiopia
Halai
Halai
Halai
Halai
1894 in the Italian Empire
December 1894 events